Suman may refer to:

Given name
 Suman (actor), Indian actor
 Suman Adhikary (born 1985), Indian director of Bengali films
 Suman Bala (born 1981), Indian field hockey player
 Suman Chakraborty, Indian engineer
 Suman Deodhar (born 1930), Indian badminton player
 Suman Ghosh (born 1967), Indian classical vocalist
 Suman Ghosh (director), Indian director of Bengali films
 Suman Kalyanpur (born 1937), Indian singer
 Suman Kundu, Indian wrestler
 Suman Mahato (born 1964), Indian politician
 Suman Mukhopadhyay (born 1966), Indian filmmaker
 Suman Muthe (born 1947), Indian social worker, activist, and writer
 Suman Nagarkar, Indian actress in Kannada films
 Suman Pokhrel (born 1967), Nepali poet, lyricist, translator, and artist
 Suman Ranganathan (born 1974), Indian model and actress
 Suman Rawat, Indian athlete
 Suman Sahai, Indian activist
 Suman Setty (born 1981), Indian actor in Tamil and Telugu films
 Suman Shashi Kant, Indian actress
 Suman Shringi, Indian politician
 Suman Sridhar (born 1983), Indian singer-songwriter
 Surendra Jha 'Suman' (1910–2002), Indian writer and politician

Surname
 Adhyayan Suman (born 1988), Indian actor in Hindi films
 Amita Suman (born 1997), British-Nepalese actress
 Balka Suman, Indian politician
 Don Suman, American college basketball coach
 John Robert Suman (1890–1972), American petroleum engineer and business executive
 Kabir Suman (born 1949), Bengali musician and poet
 Nusret Suman (1905–1978), Turkish sculptor
 Ram Ji Lal Suman (born 1950), Indian politician
 Shekhar Suman (born 1960), Indian actor
 Shivmangal Singh Suman (1915–2002), Hindi writer and poet
 Shri Dev Suman (1916–1944), Indian independence activist
 Tirumalasetti Suman (born 1983), Indian cricketer

Other uses
 Suman (food), a Philippine rice cake
 Suman, Indiana, an unincorporated community
 Suman River in Arkhangai, Mongolia